No. 249 (Gold Coast) Squadron RAF was a Royal Air Force squadron, active in the sea-patrol, fighter and bomber roles during its existence. It was one of the top scoring fighter squadrons of the RAF in World War II.

History

First formation
No. 249 Squadron was formed for the first time on 18 August 1918 from Nos. 400, 401, 419 and 450 flights at Dundee Equipped with a variety of seaplanes the squadron flew coastal patrol and anti-submarine duties as part of No. 78 Wing RAF. It remained at Dundee until April 1919 when it moved to RNAS Killingholme, without its aircraft. The squadron was disbanded not long after, on 8 October 1919.

During World War II

On 16 May 1940, 249 squadron reformed as a fighter squadron at RAF Church Fenton. Equipped with Hurricanes, the unit fought in the Battle of Britain. The only Victoria Cross awarded to an RAF Fighter Command pilot during the Battle of Britain, was won by James Brindley Nicolson while serving with 249 squadron. Offensive missions over France began in December 1940 but in May 1941, No. 249 was transferred to Malta by aircraft carrier. There it formed part of the fighter defences, converting to Spitfires in February 1942. Fighter bomber missions over Sicily began in November 1942 and October 1943 the squadron moved to Italy. Sweeps were carried out over Albania and Yugoslavia and in September 1944, No. 249 converted to Mustangs. In April 1945, it moved to Northern Yugoslavia for a month and after a short period in northern Italy the squadron disbanded on 16 August 1945.

On 23 October 1945, No. 500 Squadron at Eastleigh, Kenya was renumbered 249 Squadron and flew Baltimores for a short time before re-equipping with Mosquitoes in February 1946. After taking part in survey flights, No.249 moved to Iraq in June 1946 and became a Tempest fighter squadron.

Into the jet age
The squadron was stationed at RAF Deversoir in the Egyptian Canal Zone in 1952, flying Vampires. Vampires were received in 1950 and after a period in Egypt the squadron moved to Jordan and converted to Venoms. In August 1956, it moved to Cyprus and in July 1957 to Kenya where it disbanded on 15 October 1957. It reformed at Akrotiri on the same day as a Canberra light bomber unit and after twelve years in the area No.249 disbanded on 24 February 1969

Present
In the year 2000 the Squadron gave its number to an Air Cadet Squadron based in Hailsham, England. This was because 249 Squadron lost a man over the town during the Battle of Britain. The Air Cadets Squadron is also an affiliated member of 249 Squadron Association.

Commemoration
A Battle of Britain Class steam locomotive, Number 34073, 249 Squadron, was named after the squadron. The locomotive escaped scrapping after it was withdrawn from service in 1964 and is currently awaiting restoration to running condition. In 2014 the locomotive was moved from Bury to storage at Carnforth.

A replica Hurricane was unveiled in 2012 in Alexandra Gardens, Barry Avenue, Windsor SL4 3HD. It bears the code letters GN-J of 249 Squadron.

Noted squadron members
 Sqn Ldr George Barclay DFC
 Sqn Ldr Robert Barton OBE, DFC and bar
 Wg Cdr John "Beazle" Beazley DFC
 Flt Lt George "Buzz" Beurling DSO DFC DFM*
 Sqn Leader A G Lewis DFC and bar
 Wg Cdr Percy "Laddie" Lucas CBE DSO DFC
 Sqn Ldr Robert "Buck" McNair DSO DFC**
 Wg Cdr Tom "Ginger" Neil DFC* AFC AE
 Wg Cdr Eric Nicolson VC DFC
 Flt Lt "Titch" Palliser DFC AE
 Flt Lt Jack Rae DFC*
 Gp Cpt Stan Turner DSO DFC*
 Sqn Ldr Ernest J. Cassidy DFC AFC

Aircraft operated

References

Citations

Bibliography

 Bowyer, Chaz. Mosquito Squadrons of the Royal Air Force. Shepperton, Surrey, UK: Ian Allan Ltd., 1984. .
 Bowyer, Michael J.F. and John D.R. Rawlings. Squadron Codes, 1937–56. Cambridge, Cambridgeshire, UK: Patrick Stephens Ltd., 1979. .
 Cull, Brian. 249 at War: The Authorized History of the RAF's Top Scoring Squadron of WWII. London, Grub Street, 1997. .
 Flintham, Vic and Andrew Thomas. Combat Codes: A Full Explanation and Listing of British, Commonwealth and Allied Air Force Unit Codes Since 1938. Shrewsbury, Shropshire, UK: Airlife Publishing Ltd., 2003. .
 Halley, James J. The Squadrons of the Royal Air Force & Commonwealth, 1918–1988. Tonbridge, Kent, UK: Air-Britain (Historians) Ltd., 1988. .
 Jefford, C.G. RAF Squadrons, a Comprehensive Record of the Movement and Equipment of all RAF Squadrons and their Antecedents since 1912. Shrewsbury: Airlife Publishing, 1998 (second edition 2001). .
 Moyes, Philip J.R. Bomber Squadrons of the RAF and their Aircraft. London: Macdonald and Jane's (Publishers) Ltd., 1964 (new edition 1976). .
 Rawlings, John D.R. Coastal, Support and Special Squadrons of the RAF and their Aircraft. London: Jane's Publishing Company Ltd., 1982. .
 Rawlings, John D.R. Fighter Squadrons of the RAF and their Aircraft. London: Macdonald and Jane's (Publishers) Ltd., 1969 (new edition 1976, reprinted 1978). .

External links

 249 Squadron Association
 Aviation art painting – F/O Percy Burton of No.249 Squadron in combat over Hailsham, 27 September 1940
 History of No.'s 246–250 Squadrons at RAF Web
 Sqn History

249 Squadron
Military units and formations established in 1918
Military units and formations disestablished in 1945
Military units and formations established in 1945
1918 establishments in the United Kingdom
Military units and formations in Mandatory Palestine in World War II